Yuxarı Cürəli (also, Yukhary Dzhurali and Yukhary Dzhuraly) is a village and municipality in the Bilasuvar Rayon of Azerbaijan.  It has a population of 1,249.

Notable people
Alikram Bayramov

References 

Populated places in Bilasuvar District